Janelle Louise Parks (born August 1, 1962) is a retired American cyclist. Competing in the individual road race she won a silver medal at the 1986 World Championships and finished tenth at the 1984 Olympics. Parks won the national title in this event in 1987, placing second in 1983 and 1988. In 1985 she won the Tour de l'Aude Cycliste Féminin. Parks later married, becoming Janelle Parks-Graham, and settled in Western Australia as a cycling coach.

References

External links
 

1962 births
Living people
American female cyclists
Olympic cyclists of the United States
Cyclists at the 1984 Summer Olympics
People from Kettering, Ohio
Sportspeople from Ohio
21st-century American women